The Legend is a box set by country singer Johnny Cash, (his 91st overall release) released in 2005 (see 2005 in music) on Columbia Records and Legacy Recordings. It is one of the few multi-disc sets that contain songs recorded throughout Cash's entire career, from 1955 to 2003. Over four CDs, most of Cash's biggest hits are covered, in addition to numerous traditional compositions Cash recorded versions of, and several collaborations with other known artists, including Rosanne Cash, U2 and Bob Dylan. In keeping with Cash's persona as the Man in Black, the data surface of the discs is black. In 2006, the set won the Grammy Award for Best Boxed or Special Limited Edition Package. It was certified Gold on January 11, 2006, by the RIAA.

Track listing

Disc 1 – Win, Place and Show: The Hits

The first disc includes many of Cash's biggest hits, as well as his more well-known material from the 1970s and 1980s. A few tracks appear however for the first time on CD.

 "I Walk the Line" – 2:45
 "There You Go" – 2:17
 "Home of the Blues" – 2:40
 "Ballad of a Teenage Queen" – 2:12
 "Guess Things Happen That Way" – 1:50
 "The Ways of a Woman in Love" – 2:16
 "Don't Take Your Guns to Town" – 3:03
 "Ring of Fire" – 2:37
 "The Matador" – 2:46
 "Understand Your Man" – 2:43 
 "The Ballad of Ira Hayes" – 4:09
 "Orange Blossom Special" – 3:07
 "The One on the Right is on the Left" – 2:48
 "Rosanna's Going Wild" – 1:59 
 "Folsom Prison Blues" – 2:45
 "Daddy Sang Bass" – 2:21
 "A Boy Named Sue" – 3:46
 "What Is Truth" – 2:38 
 "Sunday Mornin' Comin' Down" – 4:07
 "Flesh and Blood" – 2:37
 "Man in Black" – 2:52
 "A Thing Called Love" – 2:33
 "Kate" – 2:17
 "Oney" – 3:05
 "Any Old Wind That Blows" – 2:46
 "One Piece at a Time" – 4:01
 "(Ghost) Riders in the Sky" – 3:46

Disc 2 – Old Favorites and New

The second disc was compiled in a similar fashion to the first, also including some of Cash's early hits, like "Hey Porter" and "Cry! Cry! Cry!", the first single he released for Sun Records. It also contains several previously unreleased tracks, a selection of his later work and a number of songs from At Folsom Prison.

 "Hey Porter" – 2:14
 "Cry! Cry! Cry!" – 2:25
 "Luther Played the Boogie" – 2:03
 "Get Rhythm" – 2:14
 "Give My Love to Rose" – 2:45
 "I Was There When It Happened" – 2:16
 "Big River" – 2:32
 "I Still Miss Someone" – 2:36
 "Pickin' Time" – 1:58
 "The Man on the Hill" – 2:09
 "Five Feet High and Rising" – 1:47
 "Tennessee Flat Top Box" – 2:59
 "I Got Stripes" – 2:04
 "Troublesome Waters" – 3:51
 "The Long Black Veil" – 3:07
 "Dark as a Dungeon" – 2:28
 "The Wall" – 2:12
 "25 Minutes to Go" – 3:12
 "Cocaine Blues" – 2:51
 "Doin' My Time" – 4:13
 "I Will Rock and Roll with You" – 2:51
 "Without Love" – 2:30
 "The Big Light" – 2:41
 "Highway Patrolman" – 5:21
 "I'm Never Gonna Roam Again" – 2:34
 "When I'm Gray" – 3:33
 "Forever Young" – 6:16

Disc 3 – The Great American Songbook

The third disc is made up primarily of traditional American compositions that have been recorded by many artists.

 "Wreck of the Old 97" – 1:47
 "Rock Island Line" – 2:11
 "Goodnight Irene" – 2:40
 "Goodbye, Little Darlin'" – 2:15
 "Born to Lose" – 2:10
 "Walking the Blues" – 2:13
 "Frankie's Man, Johnny" – 2:17
 "Delia's Gone" – 3:02 (with alternate lyrics)
 "In the Jailhouse Now" – 2:23
 "Waiting for a Train" – 2:07
 "Casey Jones" – 3:02
 "The Legend of John Henry's Hammer" – 8:26
 "I've Been Working on the Railroad" – 3:26
 "Sweet Betsy from Pike" – 3:18
 "The Streets of Laredo" – 3:40
 "Bury Me Not on the Lone Prairie" – 2:28
 "Down in the Valley" – 3:11
 "Wabash Cannonball" – 2:40
 "The Great Speckled Bird" – 2:08
 "Wildwood Flower" – 2:12
 "Cotton Fields" – 2:34
 "Pick a Bale o'Cotton" – 1:58
 "Old Shep" – 2:23
 "I'll Be All Smiles Tonight" – 2:48
 "I'm So Lonesome I Could Cry" – 2:39
 "Time Changes Everything" – 1:48

Disc 4 – Family and Friends

The fourth disc includes collaborations with Cash's family members and well-known country musicians.

 "Keep on the Sunny Side" (with the Carter Family) – 2:16
 "Diamonds in the Rough" (with Mother Maybelle Carter) – 3:10
 "(There'll Be) Peace in the Valley" (The Carter Family) – 2:48
 "Were You There (When They Crucified My Lord)" (with The Carter Family) – 3:56
 "Another Man Done Gone" (with Anita Carter) – 2:36
 "Pick the Wildwood Flower" (with Mother Maybelle Carter) – 2:59
 "Jackson" (with June Carter) – 2:46
 "If I Were a Carpenter" (with June Carter) – 3:00
 "Girl from the North Country" (with Bob Dylan) – 3:42
 "One More Ride" (with Marty Stuart) – 3:27
 "You Can't Beat Jesus Christ" (with Billy Joe Shaver) – 3:39
 "There Ain't No Good Chain Gang" (with Waylon Jennings) – 3:17
 "We Oughta Be Ashamed" (with Elvis Costello) – 2:45
 "Crazy Old Soldier" (with Ray Charles) – 3:34
 "Silver Haired Daddy of Mine" (with Tommy Cash) – 2:48
 "Who's Gene Autry?" (with John Carter Cash) – 3:51
 "The Night Hank Williams Came to Town" (with Waylon Jennings) – 3:24
 "I Walk the Line (Revisited)" (with Rodney Crowell) – 3:51
 "Highwayman" (with The Highwaymen, Kris Kristofferson, Willie Nelson, and Waylon Jennings) – 3:03
 "The Wanderer" (with U2) – 4:43
 "September When It Comes" (with Rosanne Cash) – 3:39
 "Tears in the Holston River" (with The Nitty Gritty Dirt Band) – 3:41
 "Far Side Banks of Jordan" (with June Carter) – 2:42
 "It Takes One to Know Me" (with June Carter) – 3:36

Limited edition
A limited edition of the boxset features a bonus CD of a 1955 radio performance, a bonus DVD of a March 12, 1980 CBS television special, and a 57-page lyric book.

Personnel

 Johnny Cash – Vocals, Acoustic Guitar, Guitar, Producer, Arranger, Adaptation
 Cindy Cash, June Carter Cash, Rosanne Cash, Anita Carter, Ray Charles, Kris Kristofferson – Vocals
 Carlene Carter – Vocals, Background Vocals
 Elvis Costello, Bob Dylan, Billy Joe Shaver – Vocals, Acoustic Guitar
 Willie Nelson – Vocals, Guitar
 Waylon Jennings – Vocals, Guitar, Producer
 Maybelle Carter – Vocals, Autoharp, Acoustic Guitar
 Rodney Crowell – Vocals, Acoustic Guitar, Electric Guitar, Producer
 Bill Abbott, Hoyt Axton, Barbara Bennett, Ed Bruce, Sara Bruce, The Carter Family, Don Carter, Tommy Cash, Laura Cash, Donivan Cowart, The Confederates, The Evangel Temple Choir, Lee Holt, Jan Howard, The Jordanaires, Lynn Langham, The Gene Lowery Singers, Cyd Mosteller, Louis Dean Nunley, Judy Rodman, Nita Smith, Wendy Suits, Hershel Wigginton, Asa Wilkerson, Malcolm Yelvington – Background Vocals
 John Carter Cash – Background Vocals, Acoustic Guitar, Producer, Executive Producer
 Luther Perkins – The guitar soloist picker
 Marshall Grant – Background Vocals, Bass
 The Edge – Background Vocals, Synthesizer, Producer
 Bob Carter – Harmony Vocals, Accordion
 Jeff Hanna – Harmony Vocals, National Steel Guitar
 Jimmy Ibbotson – Harmony Vocals, Mandolin
 James Burton, Helen Carter, J.R. Cobb, Ray Edenton, Jerry Hensley, Red Lane, Roy Nichols, Jerry Shook, Pete Wade, Doc Watson, Merle Watson, Johnny Western – Guitar
 Billy Sanford – Guitar, Acoustic Guitar
 Randy Scruggs – Guitar, Acoustic Guitar, Producer
 Norman Blake – Guitar, Dobro
 Tim Goodman – Guitar, Banjo
 Bob Johnson – Guitar, Banjo, Lute, Mandocello
 Jack Clement – Guitar, Rhythm Guitar, Producer
 Marty Stuart – Guitar, Mandolin, Producer
 Brian Ahern – Guitar, Tambourine, Producer
 Chips Moman, Jack Routh – Guitar, Producer
 Pete Drake, Don Helms, Ralph Mooney – Steel Guitar
 Dale Sellers – Acoustic Guitar
 Martin Belmont, Pete Bordonali, Carl Perkins, Jerry Reed, Billy Lee Riley, Stewart Smith, Bob Wootton, Reggie Young – Electric Guitar
 Dave Edmunds – Electric Guitar, Producer
 Robby Turner – Dobro, Steel Guitar
 David Mansfield – Mandocello
 John McEuen – Mandolin
 Gordon Terry – Fiddle
 Hal Blaine, Ritchie Albright, Gene Chrisman, Owen Hale, Buddy Harman, W.S. Holland, Greg Morrow, Pete Thomas, J.M. Van Eaton – Drums
 Kenny Malone, Shawn Pelton – Percussion, Drums
 Farrell Morris, Richard Morris – Percussion
 Chuck Turner – Percussion, Engineer
 Joe "Public" Allen, Floyd Chance, T. Michael Coleman, Roy Goin, Byron House, Mike Leech, Nick Lowe, Gary Lunn, Gordon Payne, Michael Rhodes, Jerry Sheff, Henry Strzelecki, Jimmy Tittle – Bass
 John Leventhal – Bass, Guitar, Keyboards, Producer
 Chuck Cochran, Floyd Cramer, Marvin Hughes, Larry McCoy, Bill Pursell, Clifford Robertson, Jimmy Smith, Jimmy Wilson – Piano
 Clayton Ivey – Piano, Organ
 Earl Ball – Piano, Producer
 Benmont Tench – Electric Piano
 Paul Davis, Bobby Emmons, Glen D. Hardin, Hargus "Pig" Robbins, Bobby Wood – Keyboards
 Larry Butler – Keyboards, Producer
 Joe Babcock, Bobby Thompson – Banjo
 Jimmie Fadden – Harmonica
 Larry Farrell – Trombone
 Karl Garvin, Bill McElhiney – Trumpet
 Jack Hale, Bob Lewin – Trumpet, Horn, French Horn
 Jay Patten – Horn
 Tony Kladeck – Flugelhorn
 Rufus Long – Flute
 Charlie McCoy, Danny Petraitis – Harmonica
 Terry McMillan – Harmonica, Percussion
 Shane Keister – Synthesizer
 Brian Eno – Synthesizer, Producer

Additional personnel

 Charlie Bragg, Don Davis, Bob Johnston, Frank Jones, Don Law, Sam Phillips, Billy Sherrill – Producers
 Flood – Producer, Loops
 Gregg Geller – Producer, Liner Notes, Compilation
 Lou Robin – Executive Producer
 J.J. Blair – Engineer
 Vic Anesini – Mastering
 Ian Cuttler – Art Direction, Design
 David Santana – Graphic Design
 Marc Burckhardt – Illustrations
 Sabeen Ahmad, Elizabeth Reilly – Photo Research
 Gisela Delgado, Jerri Meyer – Package Production
 Abe Vélez – Packaging Manager
 Steven Berkowitz – A&R
 Stacey Boyle – A&R
 Patti Matheny – A&R
 Mark "Speedy" Gonzalez, Mark Petaccia – Production Assistants
 John R. "Ricky" Jackson – Project Director
 John A. Lomax – Adaptation, Collection
 Patrick Carr – Liner Notes

Chart performance

References

2005 compilation albums
Johnny Cash compilation albums
Columbia Records compilation albums